Dario Marcolin (born 28 October 1971) is an Italian football coach and former player, who played as a midfielder. He also worked as a football pundit after retiring.

Club career
Marcolin was born in Brescia. During his career, he played for Cremonese, Lazio, Cagliari, Genoa, Blackburn Rovers (where he scored once against Manchester United at Old Trafford), Sampdoria, Piacenza, Napoli, and A.C. Palazzolo 1913.

International career
At international level, Marcolin was never capped at senior level, but represented the Italy under-21 side on 22 occasions, making his debut in 1991 alongside his Cremonese teammate Mauro Bonomi, and winning the UEFA European Under-21 Championship in 1992, and in 1994, where he was named the team's captain. He also played in the 1992 Olympic football tournament.

Style of play
An experienced central or defensive midfielder, Marcolin was usually deployed as a ball-winner due to his work-rate and stamina, or as a deep-lying playmaker, due to his good vision; however, he was also known for his lack of pace or notable athletic attributes, and in later years, as he struggled with fitness, was at times criticised for his poor work-rate in midfield. He was also known for his leadership.

Coaching career
After retiring from football as a player, he became a coach, joining Brescia as an assistant coach in 2006, and then becoming first team coach at Inter for his former Lazio teammate Roberto Mancini.

In June 2008 he accepted his first managerial role at head of Lega Pro Prima Divisione club Monza, but was fired later that year in December.
In December 2009 he was appointed as assistant to Siniša Mihajlović at Catania. Mihajlović and Marcolin had already worked together as players with Lazio, and both as assistants to Mancini at Inter.

In the 2010–11 season, after Mihajlović joined Fiorentina, he became an assistant of the club of Florence.

On 12 July 2012, he was appointed new head coach of Serie B side Modena.

In July 2013 he took over at another Serie B club, Padova, replacing Fulvio Pea at the helm of the ambitious Venetians, but he was sacked on 28 September 2013 due to poor results.

On 3 January 2015, he was named new head coach of Serie B strugglers Catania.

Honours

Player

Club
Lazio
Serie A: 1999–2000
Coppa Italia: 1997–98, 1999–2000
Supercoppa Italiana: 1998, 2000
UEFA Super Cup: 1999

International
Italy under-21
UEFA European Under-21 Championship: 1992, 1994

References

External links
Profile

1971 births
Living people
Association football midfielders
Italian footballers
Italy youth international footballers
Italy under-21 international footballers
Premier League players
U.S. Cremonese players
S.S. Lazio players
Cagliari Calcio players
Genoa C.F.C. players
Blackburn Rovers F.C. players
U.C. Sampdoria players
S.S.C. Napoli players
Piacenza Calcio 1919 players
Olympic footballers of Italy
Footballers at the 1992 Summer Olympics
Footballers from Brescia
Italian expatriate footballers
Expatriate footballers in England
Italian expatriate sportspeople in England
Serie A players
Serie B players
Italian football managers
Modena F.C. managers
Calcio Padova managers
Competitors at the 1993 Mediterranean Games
Mediterranean Games competitors for Italy
A.C. Monza managers